The Year of Happiness and Love is a 2009 Taiwanese drama starring James Wen and Amber Kuo. It was produced by Sanlih E-Television.

The series was first broadcast in Taiwan on free-to-air Taiwan Television (TTV) from 7 August 2009 to 1 January 2010, every Friday at 22:00 to 23:35 and cable TV Sanlih E-Television on 8 August 2009 to 2 January 2010, every Saturday at 22:30.

The Year of Happiness and Love was nominated in 2010 for four awards at the 45th Golden Bell Awards, including Best Actress for Amber Kuo and Best Actor for James Wen.

Synopsis
Jiang Chen Bo (James Wen) is the typical loser: He is not fashionable or charming and has no money, girlfriend or respect. Then, an out of the blue promotion changes his world. Suddenly, he becomes the beacon to his father's rather uneventful life, the love bridge between his elite boss and his innocent younger sister, the moneytree for his gold-digging lover. However, things that come easily, go easily. The news of him quitting his job caused his lover to leave him, his father to have a stroke, and his sister to break off contact with his ex-boss. He tries to come up with plans to make everything better, only to have them backfire on him. But, family is always there to help him pick up the pieces.

Cast
 James Wen as Jiang Chen Bo 
 Amber Kuo as Chen Su Xin 
 Wu Nien-jen as Chen Ding He 
 Kay Huang as Jiang Li Mei 
 Weber Yang as Lin Ying Jie 
 Ko I-chen as Lin Chang Shou 
 Lawrence Ko as Lin Ying Hao 
 Tsai Chen-nan as A Sheng 
 Lin Mei-hsiu as Xiu Yu 
 Sonia Sui as Huang Guo Fen 
 Wu Ding Qian as Huang Guo Zhi 
 Adriene Lin as Bi Er 
 Luo Bei An as Lawyer Zhao
 Zhu De Gang as Manager Gao 
 Ivy Fan as Maggie
 Chen Xi Sheng as Master
 Peter Pan as Yi Ping 一平
 Hong Sheng Wen as Simon

Awards and nominations

References

External links
  The Year of Happiness and Love official homepage at TTV
  The Year of Happiness and Love official homepage at SETTV

Taiwan Television original programming
2009 Taiwanese television series debuts
2010 Taiwanese television series endings